Government Comprehensive Secondary School (GCSS) is the premier comprehensive secondary school in Nigeria. It is located in the Borokiri neighbourhood of Port Harcourt, the capital of Rivers State, Nigeria. The school was established through the collaboration of the United States Government of John F. Kennedy represented by the United States Agency for International Development (USAID), the University of California, Los Angeles (UCLA) and the then government of Eastern Region, Nigeria in 1962. Its foundation teaching staff were professors of the University of California, Los Angeles, led by Professor Lynne C. Monroe. Monroe was principal of the school from inception until June 1964 when he returned to UCLA.

The school is currently funded and administered by the Rivers State government through the Rivers State Ministry of Education.

Notable alumni
Government Comprehensive Secondary School has produced notable alumni in different fields, they include:

Joseph Atubokiki Ajienka, former vice-chancellor of the University of Port Harcourt
A. Igoni Barrett, writer
Sam Dede, actor
Finidi George, former Nigerian footballer
Okey Wali (SAN), former president of the Nigerian Bar Association (NBA)
David Ibiyeomie, Nigerian pastor, founder and senior pastor of Salvation Ministries, Port Harcourt, Nigeria

See also
List of schools in Port Harcourt
Comprehensive High School, Aiyetoro

References

Schools in Port Harcourt
Secondary schools in Rivers State
Educational institutions established in 1962
1962 establishments in Nigeria